"Cinderella" is a song recorded by Finnish singer Krista Siegfrids. The song was released as a digital download in Finland on 1 January 2014. The song peaked at number 46 on the Finnish Download Chart and number 79 on the Finnish Airplay Chart.

Music video
A music video to accompany the release of "Cinderella" was first released onto YouTube on 28 February 2014 at a total length of three minutes and thirty-six seconds.

Track listing

Chart performance

Release history

References

2014 singles
2014 songs
Krista Siegfrids songs